Caprese salad (  or simply caprese) is an Italian salad, made of sliced fresh mozzarella, tomatoes, and sweet basil, seasoned with salt, and olive oil. It is usually arranged on a plate in restaurant practice. Like pizza Margherita, it features the colours of the Italian flag: green, white, and red. In Italy, it is usually served as an antipasto (starter), not a contorno (side dish), and it may be eaten any time of day. The caprese salad is one form of a caprese dish; it may also be served as a caprese pizza, pasta, or sandwich.

The salad is named after the island of Capri, where it is believed to have originated.  Two common stories about its origin include it being an homage to the Italian flag or "in the 20th century to appease the palates of vacationing royalty and important politicos."

Variants
Variations of Caprese salad may include Italian dressing or pesto in place of olive oil, or balsamic vinegar in addition to it. Olives may appear, along with arugula (rocket) or romaine lettuce to augment the basil. Oregano or black pepper is sometimes added. Buffalo mozzarella can be substituted for mozzarella to intensify flavor. It can also have pasta or rice mixed in with it, to make it a grain salad.

In Argentina, a country with a strong Italian influence, the Caprese salad is a typical filling of the empanada.

See also

 List of Italian dishes
 List of salads
 List of tomato dishes

References

Capri, Campania
Cheese dishes
Neapolitan cuisine
Salads
Tomato dishes
Vegetable dishes